The Salary of Sir J. Lawrence Act 1864 is an act of the Parliament of the United Kingdom. The act allowed Sir John Laird Mair Lawrence to collect an annuity alongside his salary as Governor General of India. The act received Royal Assent on 18 March 1864.

Provisions
The provisions of the act include:
Making it legal for Sir John Laird Mair Lawrence to receive both an annuity from the East India Trading Company and his full salary as Governor General of India (and so exempting him from a part of the Government of India Act 1833 which ensured the salaries of members of the Council of India, including the Governor General, were the "whole Profit or Advantage which the said Officers should enjoy during their Continuance").

Timeline
The Act had its first reading on 9 February 1864 and received Royal Assent on the 18 March 1864.

References

United Kingdom Acts of Parliament 1864
British East India Company
1864 in British law